Jehan Adam was a French 15th century mathematician. He was secretary to Nicholle Tilhart, who was notary, secretary and auditor of accounts to King Louis XI of France.

He published a manuscript in 1475 containing the first use of the terms bymillion and trimillion, which gave rise to the modern terms billion and trillion. His usage referred to the long scale values of 1012 and 1018, respectively. These terms have subsequently been revalued in English to the short scale values 109 and 1012, respectively, although the original values remain in long scale countries.

... item noctes que le premier greton dembas vault ung, le second vault [...here some words seem to be omitted...] cent, le quart vult mille, le Ve vault dix M, le VIe vault cent M, le VIIe vault Milion, Le VIIIe vault dix Million, Le IXe vault cent Millions, Le Xe vault Mil Millions, Le XIe vault dix mil Millions, Le XIIe vault Cent mil Millions, Le XIIIe vault bymillion, Le XIIIIe vault dix bymillions, Le XVe vault  bymillions, Le XVIe vault mil bymillions, Le XVIIe vault dix Mil bymillions, Le XVIIIe vault cent mil bymillions, Le XIXe vault trimillion, Le XXe vault dix trimillions ...
Translation

References

15th-century births
French mathematicians
15th-century French mathematicians
Year of death unknown
15th-century French writers